The 2022 Pacific Women's Four Nations is an invitational four-team women's association football tournament hosted by the Australian Football Federation. The tournament was held in Canberra, Australia It took place from 8 to 13 November 2022.

Participating nations
Four teams entered the Pacific Women's Four Nations Main tournament (including 2022 OFC Women's Nations Cup top three Nations). 

Australia U-20 entered the tournament as a preparations for their 2024 AFC U-20 Women's Asian Cup qualification campaign.

Venues
All matches played in the Australian Institute of Sport's Stadium.

Officials

Referees

  Georgia Ghirardello

Assistant Referees

  Maddy Allum
  Anastasia Filacouridis

Squads

Main tournament 
The official match schedule was confirmed by Football Australia on 5 November 2022.

Tiebreakers
Ranking in each group shall be determined as follows:
 Greater number of points obtained in all the group matches;
 Goal difference in all the group matches;
 Greater number of goals scored in all the group matches;
 Greater disciplinary points.
If two or more teams are equal on the basis on the above four criteria, the place shall be determined as follows:
 Result of the direct match between the teams concerned;
 Penalty shoot-out if only the teams are tied, and they met in the last round of the group;
 Drawing lots by the Organising Committee.

All times listed are Australian Eastern Daylight Time (UTC+11:00)

Tournament table

Goalscorers

See also
 2022 OFC Women's Nations Cup

References

Sport in Canberra
2022 in women's association football
Pacific Women's
2022 in Australian sport
International association football competitions hosted by Australia